America, I Believe in You is an album released by Charlie Daniels on April 12, 1993.

Track listing 
 All songs composed by Charlie Daniels, Taz DiGregorio, Charlie Hayward, Jack Gavin, Bruce Ray Brown.

   "All Night Long" - 3:31 
   "Troubles of My Own" - 3:55  
   "Tennessee Two Step" - 4:50
   "The Girl Next Door" - 3:47
   "America, I Believe in You" - 5:16
   "Oh Juanita" - 4:19
   "Sweet Little Country Girl" - 3:28
   "Alley Cat" - 3:37
   "What You Gonna Do About Me" - 3:26
   "San Miguel" - 6:45

Personnel 

 Charlie Daniels – guitar, vocals, liner notes
 Taz DiGregorio – keyboards
 Charlie Hayward – bass
 Jack Gavin – percussion, drums
 Bruce Ray Brown – guitar, vocals, backing vocals
 Carolyn Corlew – vocals, backing vocals
 Jimmy Bowen – producer
 David Corlew – executive producer
 Jerry Joyner – design
 Ron Keith – photography
 John Kelton – engineer, mixing
 Russ Martin – mixing assistant
 Glenn Meadows – digital editing, mastering
 Paula Montondo – assistant engineer, mixing assistant
 Virginia Team – art direction

Track information and credits adapted from the album's liner notes.

Chart performance

Album

Singles

References 

1993 albums
Charlie Daniels albums
Albums produced by Jimmy Bowen
Capitol Records albums